2017 in men's road cycling is about the 2017 men's bicycle races governed by the UCI.

UCI World Ranking

In 2016, the UCI launched a new ranking system for men's road racing. This ranking will continue in 2017.

Year-end ranking

World Championships

The World Road Championships is set to be held in Bergen, Norway, from 17 to 24 September 2017.

Grand Tours

UCI World Tour

For the 2017 season, the UCI added ten new events to the World Tour calendar.

UCI tours

2.HC Category Races

1.HC Category Races

Championships

Continental Championships

National Championships

UCI Teams

UCI WorldTeams
The UCI has granted a UCI WorldTour licence to the following eighteen teams:

UCI Professional Continental and Continental teams

References

 

Men's road cycling by year
2017 in sports